The following is a list of pipeline accidents in the United States in 1985. It is one of several lists of U.S. pipeline accidents. See also: list of natural gas and oil production accidents in the United States.

Incidents 

This is not a complete list of all pipeline accidents. For natural gas alone, the Pipeline and Hazardous Materials Safety Administration (PHMSA), a United States Department of Transportation agency, has collected data on more than 3,200 accidents deemed serious or significant since 1987.

A "significant incident" results in any of the following consequences:
 Fatality or injury requiring in-patient hospitalization.
 $50,000 or more in total costs, measured in 1984 dollars.
 Liquid releases of five or more barrels (42 US gal/barrel).
 Releases resulting in an unintentional fire or explosion.

PHMSA and the National Transportation Safety Board (NTSB) post-incident data and results of investigations into accidents involving pipelines that carry a variety of products, including natural gas, oil, diesel fuel, gasoline, kerosene, jet fuel, carbon dioxide, and other substances. Occasionally pipelines are re-purposed to carry different products.

The following incidents occurred during 1985:
 1985 Natural gas from a leaking line traveled through soil, and caused a massive gas explosion in El Paso, Texas on January 8. Eleven people were injured, 2 homes were destroyed, and 88 other homes were damaged by the blast.
 1985 On January 26, a leaking propylene pipeline in Baytown, Texas forced the evacuation of 600 people. There was no explosion or fire.
 1985 On February 5, a gas triggered explosion and fire destroyed 12 newly constructed condominiums in Twin Lakes, Wisconsin. A cracked gas main was the source of the gas leak, and nearby sewer work was suspected of damaging the gas line. Two firefighters were hurt extinguishing the fire.
 1985 On February 22, 1985, a police patrolman on routine patrol smelled strong natural gas odors in Sharpsville, Pennsylvania. A gas serviceman was ordered to the scene. Before the serviceman arrived at the site of the reported leak, the Sharpsville Inn, and a connecting building, exploded and burned, killing two persons. Firefighters arriving on scene moments later encountered a second, smaller explosion, which injured one firefighter. The delay in the gas serviceman getting to the incident was a contributing factor.
 1985 On April 5, lightning caused a computer malfunction with Colonial Pipeline, resulting in a pipeline rupture that sent at least 126,000 gallons of gasoline into the Yellow Leaf Creek in Talladega County, Alabama.
 1985 On April 18, fumes from an NGL pipeline, under repair near Baxter Pass, Colorado, killed one pipeline repair worker, & injured 9 others. During a lawsuit dealing with this accident, it was claimed "The "safety" procedures used were crude at best, as the workers without lifelines were directed to hold their breath and go down into the ditch for about 30 seconds to work, before coming back out of the ditch for air."
  On April 27, 1985, a Marathon Pipe Line pipeline ruptured, releasing 10,775 barrels (452,550 gallons) of a Southern Louisiana crude oil into Newton Lake, a 1,750-acre electric power plant cooling lake in Jasper County, Illinois.
The fireball from the incident could be seen 20 miles away.(April 27, 1985)
 1985 On May 10, a Mohave County, Arizona road crew hit a 2-inch gas pipeline, while reinstalling a fallen stop sign, in Butler, Arizona. During repairs to the gas line, a flash fire ignited, injuring 2 fire fighters, and a Southern Union Gas Co. worker.
 1985 Workers on the extension of the North Dallas Tollway ruptured a 12-inch gasoline pipeline on June 19, causing a massive gasoline spill along a creek bed north of Dallas, Texas. The gasoline later ignited. One person had moderate injuries, several office buildings were damaged by fire, and some automobiles were damaged.
 1985 On June 20, a telephone cable installing crew broke a 10 inch gas gathering pipeline, in Paradise, Texas, releasing gas, that ignited 20 seconds later. There were no injuries.
The cracked girth weld allowed the release, atomization of, and ignition of aircraft turbine fuel under 430 pounds pressure, killing one person, burning six other persons, and destroying construction equipment.
 1985 On August 22, a vessel was being filled with Liquefied Natural Gas (LNG), when it burst, leading to a flash fire that burned 6 people, at a gas facility in Pinson, Alabama.
There were evacuations, but no fire.
 1985 A Texas Eastern Transmission Corp. natural gas pipeline exploded near Hillsboro in Fleming County, Kentucky on October 26. There were two injuries reported.
 1985 On November 1, a Columbia Gas Transmission pipeline exploded and burned near Rowenna, Pennsylvania, shooting flames 200 feet into the air, and causing dozens of residents to evacuate. A gas metering station and pressure regulator were also damaged.
 On November 6, a MAPCO pipeline leaked an ethane-propane mix, causing injuries to 2 pipeline workers, in Clinton County, Iowa.
 1985 On November 28, Olympic Pipeline spilled about 31,000 gallons of jet fuel at Seattle–Tacoma International Airport, due to a valve being left open. The fuel entered a storm drain, that led to the Des Moines River, killing fish and wildlife for 2.5 miles. Later, the company was fined $15,000 for the spill by the Washington Department of Ecology.
 1985 On December 6, a natural gas explosion and fire destroyed the River Restaurant in Derby, Connecticut. Gas escaping from a broken gas main at a pressure of about 1 pound per square inch had escaped, migrated into the restaurant basement, ignited, exploded, and burned. Of the 18 persons inside the restaurant at the time, 6 were killed and 12 were injured; 1 passerby and 1 firefighter were also injured. After the accident the street adjacent to the restaurant was excavated where a 24-inch sewer system had just been installed; An 87-year-old, 3-inch, cast-iron natural gas main was found broken.
 1985 On December 5, a Central Florida Pipeline products line burst in Lake Alfred, Florida, spilling about 40,000 gallons of gasoline. The landowner affected later sued the pipeline for failure to remove contaminated soil. There were no injuries or fire.
 1985 A water Department crew hit the cap of an illegal tap into a Four Corners crude oil pipeline on December 18, near Cabazon, California. About 47,000 gallons of crude were spilled.

References

Lists of pipeline accidents in the United States